Events from the year 1910 in Michigan.

Office holders

State office holders

 Governor of Michigan: Fred M. Warner (Republican)
 Lieutenant Governor of Michigan: Patrick H. Kelley (Republican) 
 Michigan Attorney General: Franz C. Kuhn
 Michigan Secretary of State: Frederick C. Martindale (Republican)
 Speaker of the Michigan House of Representatives: Colin P. Campbell (Republican)
 Chief Justice, Michigan Supreme Court:

Mayors of major cities

 Mayor of Detroit: Philip Breitmeyer
 Mayor of Grand Rapids: George E. Ellis
 Mayor of Saginaw: George W. Stewart, M.D.
 Mayor of Flint: Guy W. Selby

Federal office holders

 U.S. Senator from Michigan: Julius C. Burrows (Republican)
 U.S. Senator from Michigan: William Alden Smith (Republican) 
 House District 1: Edwin Denby (Republican)
 House District 2: Charles E. Townsend (Republican)
 House District 3: Washington Gardner (Republican)
 House District 4: Edward L. Hamilton (Republican)
 House District 5: Gerrit J. Diekema (Republican)
 House District 6: Samuel William Smith (Republican)
 House District 7: Henry McMorran (Republican)
 House District 8: Joseph W. Fordney (Republican)
 House District 9: James C. McLaughlin (Republican)
 House District 10: George A. Loud (Republican)
 House District 11: Francis H. Dodds (Republican)
 House District 12: H. Olin Young (Republican)

Population

Sports

Baseball

 1910 Detroit Tigers season – After winning three consecutive American League pennants from 1907 to 1909, the Tigers finished third in the American League with a record of 86–68 under manager Hughie Jennings. Outfielder Ty Cobb won his fourth consecutive batting title with an average of .383 and also led the American League in runs scored with 106. George Mullin led the pitching staff with 21 wins, and Ed Willett led with a 2.37 earned run average.
 1910 Michigan Wolverines baseball season - Under head coach Branch Rickey, the Wolverines compiled a 17–8 record. Clarence Enzenroth was the team captain.

American football

 1910 Michigan Wolverines football team – Under head coach Fielding H. Yost, Michigan compiled a 3–0–3 record and outscored opponents 29 to 9. Left guard and team captain Albert Benbrook was selected as a consensus first-team All-American for the second consecutive year.
 1910 Michigan Agricultural Aggies football team – Under head coach Chester Brewer, the Aggies compiled a 6–1 record and outscored their opponents 168 to 8. 
 1910 Central Michigan Normalites football team - Under head coach Harry Helmer, the Central Michigan football team compiled a 6–1–1 record, shut out five of eight opponents, and outscored all opponents by a combined total of 112 to 33.
 1910 Western State Hilltoppers football team - Under head coach William H. Spaulding, the Hilltoppers compiled a 4–1–1 record and outscored their opponents, 75 to 20.
 1910 Michigan State Normal Normalites football team – Under head coach Curry Hicks, the Normalites compiled a record of 0–5–1.
 1910 Detroit College football team – Under head coach George A. Kelly, the team compiled a 3–2 record, but was outscored by its opponents by a combined total of 67 to 28.

Chronology of events

Births
 January 1 - Seth Lover, designer of amplifiers who the humbucker or hum-cancelling electric stringed instrument pickup, in Kalamazoo
 January 26 - William C. Lawe,  United States Navy sailor who was awarded the Distinguished Flying Cross and Purple Heart for his role in the Battle of Midway during World War II, in Carson City, Michigan
 February 12 - Jay Leyda, avant-garde filmmaker and film historian, noted for his work on U.S., Soviet, and Chinese cinema, in Detroit
 February 27 - Kelly Johnson,  aeronautical and systems engineer who was a team leader of the Lockheed Skunk Works whose contributions included the Lockheed U-2, SR-71 Blackbird, the first production aircraft to exceed Mach 3, and the first fighter capable of Mach 2, in Ishpeming, Michigan
 March 12 - Roger L. Stevens, theatrical producer and founding Chairman of both the Kennedy Center for the Performing Arts (1961) and National Endowment for the Arts (1965), in Detroit
 April 3 - James Enright, basketball referee who was inducted into the Naismith Memorial Basketball Hall of Fame, in Sodus, Michigan 
 April 3 - Curtis Williams Sabrosky, entomologist specializing in chloropidae, in Sturgis, Michigan
 April 5 - Watson Spoelstra, sportswriter for The Detroit News and president of the Baseball Writers' Association of America, in Grand Rapids
 April 28 - Everett Barksdale, jazz guitarist and session musician, in Detroit
 May 14 - Willard J. Smith, thirteenth Commandant of the United States Coast Guard from 1966 to 1970, in Suttons Bay, Michigan
 May 30 - Alvin Andreas Herborg Nielsen, physicist known for his work in molecular spectroscopy, in Menominee, Michigan
 May 30 - Frank S. Besson, Jr., general in U.S. Army and head of the U.S. Army Materiel Command, in Detroit
 June 28 - John D. Kraus, physicist known for his contributions to electromagnetics, radio astronomy, and antenna theory, in Ann Arbor
 July 14 - Virginia Harriett Kline, geologist, stratigrapher, and librarian, in Coleman, Michigan
 November 22 - Mary Jackson, actress (The Waltons, Days of Our Lives) in Milford, Michigan
 December 7 - Clem Sohn, airshow dare-devil who perfected a way of gliding through the air with a home-made wingsuit, in Fowler, Michigan
 December 17 - Sy Oliver, African-American jazz arranger, trumpeter, composer, singer and bandleader, in Battle Creek

Deaths
 March 10 - Ebenezer O. Grosvenor, former Lieutenant Governor and State Treasurer, in Jonesville, Michigan
 March 30 - William Webb Ferguson, first African-American man elected to Michigan House of Representatives
 July 23 - Henry H. Aplin, Congressman, in West Bay City

See also
 History of Michigan
 History of Detroit

References